Sandra Leal is a pharmacist, a public health champion, an advocate, a healthcare executive, and the 166th President of the American Pharmacists Association.

Early life and education
Leal grew up in Nogales, Arizona, and attended the University of Arizona before graduating from the University of Colorado's School of Pharmacy in 1999. She obtained a Master of Public Health from the University of Massachusetts, Amherst.

Career
She completed her residency at the Department of Veterans Affairs facility in Tucson, Arizona, and a fellowship with the Department of Health and Human Services. She has worked for the El Rio Community Health Center, Chief Executive Officer for SinfoníaRx, and as an Executive Vice President for Tabula Rasa Healthcare. In 2021 she became the Vice President for Collaborative Innovation and Clinical Strategy for Aetna, a CVS Health Company. In 2022 she was promoted to vice president for Pharmacy Practice Innovation for CVS Health.

Leal became the President of the American Pharmacists Association on March 15, 2021. She is only the 11th woman of 166 APhA presidents, the second Latina, and fifth person of color. Before that, she was the President for the Association of Clinicians for the Underserved and the National Center for Farmworker Health.

Professional service
Leal was the first pharmacist to prescribe under collaborative practice in the state of Arizona. She has been a Flu Fighter with the CDC.

Awards
Leal received the American Pharmacists Association Good Government Pharmacist of the Year Award in 2015. She was named Pharmacist of the Year in 2009 by the Arizona Pharmacy Association. She is a two time recipient of the American Pharmacists Association Foundation. She also received the American Society of Health-System Pharmacists Best Practice Award and the National Association of Community Health Centers Innovative Research in Primary Care Award. She is only the sixth honorary member of Kappa Epsilon.

References

External links
2009 interview with ScienceBlogs

American women in business
University of Colorado Denver alumni
Year of birth missing (living people)
Living people
American pharmacists
Women pharmacists
21st-century American women